The Cain House, also known as the Alexander Creel Tavern and the St. Marys Lodge #41 A.F. & A. M. was built in 1850 for Alexander H. Creel in St. Marys, West Virginia. The Cain House provided lodging for travelers along the Ohio River, and functioned as a courthouse for Pleasants County immediately after its formation.

The Cain House was named for Zachariah Cain and his family, who operated the tavern in the late 19th and early 20th centuries. The house was acquired by a fraternal order, the Maccabees, before becoming home to a masonic lodge in 1957.

References

Houses on the National Register of Historic Places in West Virginia
Houses in Pleasants County, West Virginia
Houses completed in 1850
Drinking establishments on the National Register of Historic Places in West Virginia
Greek Revival houses in West Virginia
National Register of Historic Places in Pleasants County, West Virginia
Masonic buildings in West Virginia
1850 establishments in Virginia
Clubhouses on the National Register of Historic Places in West Virginia